Elvin Oliva Casildo (born 24 October 1997) is a Honduran professional footballer who plays as a defender for Liga Nacional de Honduras club Olimpia.

Career 
Oliva made his professional debut with Olimpia in a 1–0 Liga Nacional win over Real C.D. España on 11 August 2016.

Honours 
Honduras Youth
 Pan American Silver Medal: 2019

References

External links
 

1997 births
Living people
People from Santa Rosa de Copan
Honduran footballers
Honduras youth international footballers
Association football defenders
C.D. Olimpia players
Liga Nacional de Fútbol Profesional de Honduras players
Footballers at the 2020 Summer Olympics
Olympic footballers of Honduras
Pan American Games medalists in football
Pan American Games silver medalists for Honduras
Medalists at the 2019 Pan American Games
Footballers at the 2019 Pan American Games